Carl Mancel Sullivan (February 22, 1918 – October 15, 1992) was an American Major League Baseball second baseman who played in one game for the Detroit Tigers on July 6, . He went hitless in one at bat.

External links

Detroit Tigers players
Minor league baseball managers
Abilene Blue Sox players
Buffalo Bisons (minor league) players
Dallas Rebels players
Gainesville Owls players
Lamesa Lobos players
Little Rock Travelers players
Longview Texans players
Lubbock Hubbers players
Odessa Oilers players
Pensacola Pilots players
Plainview Ponies players
Shreveport Sports players
Baseball players from Texas
1918 births
1992 deaths
People from Collin County, Texas
Sportspeople from the Dallas–Fort Worth metroplex